Vine is a surname, and may refer to:

 Barbara Vine, pseudonym of British writer Ruth Rendell
 Carl Vine, Australian composer
 David Vine, British television presenter
 Fred Vine, English geologist and geophysicist who co-authored a critically important paper in the 1960s on continental drift
 Harriette Vine, New Zealand lawyer
 Ian Vine, British composer
 Jay Vine, Australian professional racing cyclist
 Jeremy Vine, English journalist and radio presenter
 Joseph Vine, professional cricketer
 Rowan Vine, English footballer
 Stella Vine, English artist
 Tim Vine, English comedian
 William Edwin Vine, English Biblical scholar, theologian and writer, most famous for Vine's Expository Dictionary of Old and New Testament Words

See also
 Vine
 Vines (surname)